Yancey Arias (born June 27, 1971) is an American actor. He played Miguel Cadena in the NBC series Kingpin and Gabriel Williams in the FX series Thief.

Life and career
Arias's mother, Miriam, is Puerto Rican and his father, Tony, is Colombian. Arias was born and raised in New York City. He attended Moore Catholic High School and St. John's Preparatory School before studying theater at Carnegie Mellon University.

His first big break came in the Broadway production of Miss Saigon in 1992, which he worked on in different capacities for several years. In addition to television roles, he also continued to work on stage, including a starring role in The Wild Party in 2000.

In 2001, he moved to Los Angeles, where he lives with his wife,  actress Anna Alvim. In 2004, he played little DeeDee's(actress Essence Atkins) love interest on the sitcom Half & Half.

In July 2013, it was announced that Arias would play Carl Villante, the head of an elite investigative unit, in the ABC series Castle. He appears in the film Cesar Chavez.

In 2017, Arias plays Colonel Cortez in USA's hit series Queen of the South.

See also

List of Puerto Ricans

References

External links

Official website

1971 births
Male actors from New York City
American male film actors
American male stage actors
American male television actors
Hispanic and Latino American male actors
Carnegie Mellon University College of Fine Arts alumni
American people of Colombian descent
Living people
People from Staten Island
American people of Puerto Rican descent
Colombian actors